The Guadalupe darter (Percina apristis) is a small species of freshwater ray-finned fish, a darter from the subfamily Etheostomatinae, part of the family Percidae, which also contains the perches, ruffes and pikeperches. It is  found in the Guadalupe River system in Texas. It prefers fast rocky runs of small to medium-sized rivers. The darter is typically  in length.

References

apristis
Fish described in 1954
Taxa named by Carl Leavitt Hubbs
Taxa named by Clark Hubbs